The Phoenix Symphony is an American symphony orchestra based in Phoenix, Arizona.  The orchestra performs primarily at Phoenix Symphony Hall, and is the only full-time, professional orchestra in the state of Arizona.

History
Founded in 1947, the orchestra began as an occasional group of amateur musicians performing four concerts each year, with John Barnett as its first music director, from 1947 to 1948.  In subsequent years, music faculty from Arizona State University joined the ensemble, which attained part-time status.  During the music directorship of Theo Alcántara, from 1978 to 1988, the orchestra achieved full-time status in 1983.	

During the music directorship of James Sedares, from 1989 to 1995, the orchestra recorded commercially for KOCH International Classics.  Hermann Michael was principal guest conductor and artistic adviser of the orchestra for two seasons, and then its music director from 1997 to 2004.  

Michael Christie was music director of the orchestra from 2005 to 2013.  In 2011, Jim Ward became president and chief executive officer of the orchestra, and negotiated financial restructuring to address fiscal deficits and financial challenges.  With Christie, the orchestra recorded commercially for Naxos Records.  Christie was subsequently music director laureate of the orchestra from 2013 to 2016.  

In February 2014, the orchestra named Tito Muñoz as its 11th music director, after two guest-conducting appearances by Muñoz with the orchestra.

In January 2020, the orchestra announced the appointment of Suzanne Wilson as its next president and chief executive officer, effective 21 January 2020, in succession to Ward following his retirement from the post.  In March 2020, in the wake of the COVID-19 pandemic and resulting concert cancellations, the orchestra furloughed its musicians for the remainder of the 2019-2020 season, along with reductions in its administrative and artistic personnel, and salary reductions for remaining staff.  In August 2020, the orchestra announced the cancellation of its 2020-2021 concert season, the first US orchestra to cancel its planned 2020-2021 season in its entirety, again in the wake of the COVID-19 pandemic.

The Orchestra resumed performing for the 2021-22 season, opening the season with a program of Romantic Era music featuring violin soloist Giora Schmidt on October 22, 2021.

References

Music directors
John Barnett (1947-1948)
Robert Lawrence (1949-1951)
Leslie Hodge (1952-1958)
Guy Taylor (1959-1968)
Philip Spurgeon (1969-1971)
Eduardo Mata (1972-1978)
Theo Alcántara (1978-1988)
James Sedares (1989-1995)
Hermann Michael (1997-2004)
Michael Christie (2005-2013)
Tito Muñoz (2014-present)

External links
 Official website of the Phoenix Symphony
 Stephen Lemons, 'Michael Christie and the Ongoing Rumble in the Phoenix Symphony'.  Phoenix New Times (blog entry), 23 March 2009

Musical groups established in 1947
American orchestras
1947 establishments in Arizona
Performing arts in Arizona
Musical groups from Phoenix, Arizona